Paul-Mounged El-Hachem (8 September 1934 – 7 October 2022) was a Lebanese Maronite prelate of the Catholic Church. He worked in the diplomatic service of the Holy See as apostolic nuncio to Kuwait, Bahrain, Qatar, United Arab Emirates and Yemen, and as apostolic delegate to the Arabian Peninsula. He headed the Maronite Catholic Eparchy of Baalbek-Deir El Ahmar from 1995 to 2005.

Biography
El-Hachem was born on 8 September 1934 in Aqoura, Lebanon. He was ordained a priest of the Maronite Catholic Patriarchate of Antioch on 28 March 1959. He worked for years in Lebanon. 

El-Hachem studied at the seminary in Ghazir and went on to continue his education at Carmes Seminary in Paris. He had master's degrees in journalism, international studies, and social studies. He received a doctorate in theology and canon law from the Catholic University of Paris. He spoke Arabic, French, Italian, English, Syriac, Latin, Greek and Aramaic.

Pope John Paul II awarded him on, 11 December 1978, an Honorific Chaplain of His Holiness.

From 1967 to 1970, he served as director of the Arabic programs for Vatican Radio. From 1970 to 1978, he was an official of the Commission for Social Communications, vice-director for the Holy See Press Office. In 1974 he was appointed delegate in charge of the Vatican Film Library. 

From 1978 to 1995, El-Hachem worked at the Vatican Secretariat of State. From 1991 to 2004 he was a professor of Islamic law at the Pontifical Lateran University. 

On 30 October 1993 he was appointed head of the General Affairs Section of the Vatican Secretariat of State.

On 10 June 1995, he was appointed bishop of the Eparchy of Baalbek-Deir El-Ahmar, succeeding Philippe Boutros Chebaya. The Maronite Patriarch of Antioch, Nasrallah Boutros Sfeir, consecrated him as a bishop on 13 September 1995. His co-consecrators were Boutros Gemayel, Archeparch of Cyprus and Roland Aboujaoudé, Auxiliary Bishop of Antioch.

On 27 August 2005, El-Hachem was appointed Titular Archbishop of Darnis and named apostolic nuncio to Kuwait, Bahrain, Yemen and Qatar and apostolic delegate to the Arabian Peninsula. On 4 August 2007 El-Hachem was appointed apostolic nuncio to the United Arab Emirates as well.

El-Hachem retired when he was replaced in those positions on 2 December 2009. He died on 7 October 2022, at the age of 88.

See also
 List of heads of the diplomatic missions of the Holy See

References

External links

 http://www.gcatholic.org/dioceses/diocese/baal1.htm
 Paul-Mounged El-Hachem at Catholic Hierarchy

1934 births
2022 deaths
Lebanese clergy
People from Byblos District
Lebanese Roman Catholic archbishops
Lebanese Roman Catholics
21st-century Maronite Catholic bishops
20th-century Maronite Catholic bishops
Apostolic Nuncios to Kuwait
Apostolic Nuncios to Bahrain
Apostolic Nuncios to Yemen
Apostolic Nuncios to Qatar
Apostolic Nuncios to United Arab Emirates
Bishops appointed by Pope John Paul II